BusinessLDN (spoken as Business London) is a not for profit advocacy group with a membership composed of leaders of businesses in London, United Kingdom. 

, it represented around 175 London based businesses. 

Its stated aim is "to make London the best city in the world in which to do business".

History 
London First was established in 1992 to meet a perceived lack of a unitary body to promote London after the dissolution of the Greater London Council.  Its first chair was Allen Sheppard, Baron Sheppard of Didgemere.

London First has supported plans to provide roofing over major roads in London amongst other transport infrastructure developments, a proposal that was under consideration by then London mayor Boris Johnson. It has criticised the Cameron ministry's proposal to require a bond of £ 3 000 for some visitors to the UK.

London First was a partner in the 2014 "Wikimania".

London First was given its present name in July 2022

Leadership 
John Dickie was appointed chief executive in May 2021. 

Its former chief executives were Jasmine Whitbread and Baroness Jo Valentine.

Leadership Team   

 John Dickie - Chief Executive
 Muniya Barua - Deputy Chief Executive
 Dimitra Christakou - Chief Operating Officer

Board 
Sir Kenneth Olisa succeeded Paul Drechsler CBE as Chair in 2023.

Policy Response 
In July 2021, London First urged firms to return to the office, after the COVID-19 pandemic forced an increase in remote work.

Rebranding 
On 12 July 2022, London First renamed as BusinessLDN (spoken as Business London).

References

External links
 

British lobbyists
Business organisations based in London
1992 establishments in England